The Hausdorff−Young inequality is a foundational result in the mathematical field of Fourier analysis. It is now typically understood as a rather direct corollary of the Plancherel theorem, found in 1910, in combination with the Riesz-Thorin theorem, originally discovered by Marcel Riesz in 1927. With this machinery, it readily admits several generalizations, including to multidimensional Fourier series and to the Fourier transform on the real line, Euclidean spaces, as well as more general spaces. With these extensions, it is one of the best-known results of Fourier analysis, appearing in nearly every introductory graduate-level textbook on the subject.

The nature of the Hausdorff-Young inequality can be understood with only Riemann integration and infinite series as prerequisite. Given a continuous function , define its "Fourier coefficients" by

for each integer . The Hausdorff-Young inequality says that

Loosely speaking, this can be interpreted as saying that the "size" of the function , as represented by the right-hand side of the above inequality, controls the "size" of its sequence of Fourier coefficients, as represented by the left-hand side.

However, this is only a very specific case of the general theorem. The usual formulations of the theorem are given below, with use of the machinery of  spaces and Lebesgue integration.

The conjugate exponent
Given a nonzero real number , define the real number  (the "conjugate exponent" of ) by the equation

If  is equal to one, this equation has no solution, but it is interpreted to mean that  is infinite, as an element of the extended real number line. Likewise, if  is infinite, as an element of the extended real number line, then this is interpreted to mean that  is equal to one.

The commonly understood features of the conjugate exponent are simple:
 the conjugate exponent of a number in the range [1,2] is in the range [2,∞]
 the conjugate exponent of a number in the range [2,∞] is in the range [1,2]
 the conjugate exponent of 2 is 2

Statements of the theorem

Fourier series
Given a function  one defines its "Fourier coefficients" as a function  by

although for an arbitrary function , these integrals may not exist.

The Hausdorff-Young inequality says that, for any number p in the interval (1,2], one has

Conversely, still supposing ∈(1,2], if  is a mapping for which

then there exists  whose Fourier coefficients are c and with

References. Section XII.2 in volume II of Zygmund's book

Multidimensional Fourier series
The case of Fourier series generalizes to the multidimensional case. Given a function  define its Fourier coefficients  by

As in the case of Fourier series, the assumption that f is in Lp for some value of p in [1,∞] ensures, via the Hölder inequality, the existence of the Fourier coefficients.  Now, the Hausdorff-Young inequality says that if p is in the range [1,2], then

References. Page 248 of Folland's book

The Fourier transform
One defines the multidimensional Fourier transform by

The Hausdorff-Young inequality, in this setting, says that if p is a number in the interval [1,2], then one has

for any f in Lp(ℝn).

References. page 114 of Grafakos' book, page 165 of Hörmander's book, page 11 of Reed and Simon's book, or section 5.1 of Stein and Weiss' book. Hörmander and Reed-Simon's books use conventions for the definition of the Fourier transform which are different from those of this article.

The language of normed vector spaces
The above results can be rephrased succinctly as:
 the map which sends a function  to its Fourier coefficients defines a bounded complex-linear map  for any number  in the range . Here  denotes Lebesgue measure and  denotes counting measure. Furthermore, the operator norm of this linear map is less than or equal to one.
 the map which sends a function  to its Fourier transform defines a bounded complex-linear map  for any number  in the range . Furthermore, the operator norm of this linear map is less than or equal to one.

Proof
Here we use the language of normed vector spaces and bounded linear maps, as is convenient for application of the Riesz-Thorin theorem. There are two ingredients in the proof:
 according to the Plancherel theorem, the Fourier series (or Fourier transform) defines a bounded linear map .
The operator norm of either linear maps is less than or equal to one, as one can directly verify. One can then apply the Riesz–Thorin theorem.

Beckner's sharp Hausdorff-Young inequality
Equality is achieved in the Hausdorff-Young inequality for (multidimensional) Fourier series by taking

for any particular choice of integers  In the above terminology of "normed vector spaces", this asserts that the operator norm of the corresponding bounded linear map is exactly equal to one.

Since the Fourier transform is closely analogous to the Fourier series, and the above Hausdorff-Young inequality for the Fourier transform is proved by exactly the same means as the Hausdorff-Young inequality for Fourier series, it may be surprising that equality is not achieved for the above Hausdorff-Young inequality for the Fourier transform, aside from the special case  for which the Plancherel theorem asserts that the Hausdorff-Young inequality is an exact equality.

This is an improvement of the standard Hausdorff-Young inequality, as the context  and  ensures that the number appearing on the right-hand side of this "Babenko–Beckner inequality" is less than or equal to 1. Moreover, this number cannot be replaced by a smaller one, since equality is achieved in the case of Gaussian functions. In this sense, Beckner's paper gives an optimal ("sharp") version of the Hausdorff-Young inequality. In the language of normed vector spaces, it says that the operator norm of the bounded linear map , as defined by the Fourier transform, is exactly equal to

The condition on the exponent
The condition  is essential.

References

Research articles
 English transl., Amer. Math. Soc. Transl. (2) 44, pp. 115–128

Textbooks
Bergh, Jöran; Löfström, Jörgen. Interpolation spaces. An introduction. Grundlehren der Mathematischen Wissenschaften, No. 223. Springer-Verlag, Berlin-New York, 1976. x+207 pp.
Folland, Gerald B. Real analysis. Modern techniques and their applications. Second edition. Pure and Applied Mathematics (New York). A Wiley-Interscience Publication. John Wiley & Sons, Inc., New York, 1999. xvi+386 pp. 
Grafakos, Loukas. Classical Fourier analysis. Third edition. Graduate Texts in Mathematics, 249. Springer, New York, 2014. xviii+638 pp. 
Hewitt, Edwin; Ross, Kenneth A. Abstract harmonic analysis. Vol. II: Structure and analysis for compact groups. Analysis on locally compact Abelian groups. Die Grundlehren der mathematischen Wissenschaften, Band 152 Springer-Verlag, New York-Berlin 1970 ix+771 pp.
Hörmander, Lars. The analysis of linear partial differential operators. I. Distribution theory and Fourier analysis. Reprint of the second (1990) edition [Springer, Berlin; MR1065993]. Classics in Mathematics. Springer-Verlag, Berlin, 2003. x+440 pp. 
Reed, Michael; Simon, Barry. Methods of modern mathematical physics. II. Fourier analysis, self-adjointness. Academic Press [Harcourt Brace Jovanovich, Publishers], New York-London, 1975. xv+361 pp.
Stein, Elias M.; Weiss, Guido. Introduction to Fourier analysis on Euclidean spaces. Princeton Mathematical Series, No. 32. Princeton University Press, Princeton, N.J., 1971. x+297 pp.
Zygmund, A. Trigonometric series. Vol. I, II. Third edition. With a foreword by Robert A. Fefferman. Cambridge Mathematical Library. Cambridge University Press, Cambridge, 2002. xii; Vol. I: xiv+383 pp.; Vol. II: viii+364 pp. 

Inequalities
Fourier analysis